Constantin, King of Armenia may refer to:

 Constantine I, King of Armenia
 Constantine II, King of Armenia
 Constantine III, King of Armenia